Basil O'Rourke (27 January 1930 – 3 March 2017) was an Australian rules footballer who played for the Richmond Football Club in the Victorian Football League (VFL).

Notes

External links 
		

2017 deaths
1930 births
Australian rules footballers from Victoria (Australia)
Richmond Football Club players